The 1989 Britannic Assurance County Championship was the 90th officially organised running of the County Championship. Worcestershire won their second successive Championship title. 
A sub-standard pitch at Southchurch Park, for which Essex were docked the 25 points, cost them the Championship.

Table
16 points for a win
8 points to each side for a tie
8 points to side still batting in a match in which scores finish level
Bonus points awarded in the first 100 overs of the first innings
Batting: 150 runs - 1 point, 200 runs - 2 points 250 runs - 3 points, 300 runs - 4 points
Bowling: 3-4 wickets - 1 point, 5-6 wickets - 2 points 7-8 wickets - 3 points, 9-10 wickets - 4 points
No bonus points awarded in a match starting with less than 8 hours' play remaining. A one-innings match is played, with the winner gaining 12 points.
Position determined by points gained. If equal, then decided on most wins.

Notes

References

1989 in English cricket
County Championship seasons